Radium Futebol Clube, commonly known as Radium, is a currently inactive Brazilian football club based in Mococa, São Paulo state.

The club's home colours are green and white and the team mascot is a parakeet.

History
The club was founded on May 1, 1919,  after the merger of local clubs Operário Futebol Clube and Mocoquense Futebol Clube. Radium won the Campeonato Paulista Série A2 and the Campeonato Paulista do Interior in 1950.

Achievements
 Campeonato Paulista Série A2:
 Winners (1): 1950

Stadium
Radium Futebol Clube play their home games at Estádio Olímpico de São Sebastião, commonly known as Estádio São Sebastião. The stadium has a maximum capacity of 5,000 people.

Indoor team
They had a very good indoor team in the late '50s. Pelé played there.

References

Association football clubs established in 1919
Football clubs in São Paulo (state)
1919 establishments in Brazil